The Marines Are Coming is a 1934 American action drama film directed by David Howard and starring  William Haines, Conrad Nagel and Esther Ralston. It was produced and distributed by the independent Mascot Pictures. It was the final film acting role of Haines who had a major success in the 1928 film Tell it to the Marines.

Plot summary 
A brash marine lieutenant with a history of active service overseas and heavy debts in the United States is assigned to a new post with his new company under the command of his former rival.  The marine falls in love with his commanding officer's fiancée and romances her away from him.  The day before their wedding, the fiancée calls it off after the marine is involved with an incident in Tijuana.  The fiancée leaves for Central America during the Banana Wars to join her father, who is a diplomat, and the disgraced marine quits but re-enlists as a private.  Assigned to a post in Central America, the marine discovers he must rescue his rival, who has been captured by the rebels plotting to overthrow the territorial governor, his former fiancée's father.

Cast 
William Haines as Lt. William "Wild Bill" Traylor
Conrad Nagel as Capt. Edward "Ned" Benton
Esther Ralston as Dorothy Manning
Armida as Rosita Hernández Consuelo Ibera y Buenaventura
Edgar Kennedy as Sgt. Buck Martin
Hale Hamilton as Colonel Gilroy
George Regas as The Torch (uncredited)
Smiley Burnette as	Sailor Delivering Flowers to Bill

Soundtrack 
 "Semper Fidelis" (Music by John Philip Sousa)
 Armida - "Brazilian Baby" (Written by Gus Edwards)

External links 

1934 films
1934 romantic drama films
American black-and-white films
American action films
American war drama films
American romantic drama films
Films directed by David Howard
Mascot Pictures films
Films about the United States Marine Corps
Films produced by Nat Levine
1930s action films
1930s English-language films
1930s American films